Park Avenue Line can refer to the following transit lines:
Park Avenue Line (Brooklyn surface), former streetcar
Park Avenue Line (Brooklyn elevated), former rapid transit
Park Avenue Line (Manhattan surface), bus, formerly streetcar
Park Avenue Line (Paterson), bus, formerly streetcar

See also 
 Park Avenue (disambiguation) 
 Park Avenue Tunnel (disambiguation), various in Manhattan 
 Park Avenue Viaduct (disambiguation)